Enhydrina, commonly known as the beaked sea snake, hook-nosed sea snake, common sea snake, is a genus of highly venomous sea snakes.  Study of Enhydrina is important for the making of anti-venom. The only sea snake anti-venom available at this time is for snakes in Malaysia of the Species Enhydrina schistosa, often noted as E. schistosa.

Species
Enhydrina schistosa common throughout the tropical Indo-Pacific. This species is implicated in more than 50% of all bites caused by sea snakes, as well as the majority of envenomings and fatalities. Also called the Valakadyn sea snake.
Enhydrina zweifeli snakes are found from New Guinea to Australia (Northern Territory and Queensland). As called Sepik or Zweifel's beaked sea snake. In the past they were thought to be Enhydrina schistosa, but after DNA testing are now provisionally identified as Enhydrina zweifeli. DNA test have shown they are not related to Enhydrina schistosa.

Both species are found in shallow open sea, river mouths, estuaries, coastal lagoons, and mangrove forests. Normally in water from 3.7-22.2 meters deep. Usually over soft bottoms like mud and sand. Some are found in freshwater lakes in Cambodia and India. They have been found to travel up rivers. One was found 7 km upriver in Goa, India.

References 
Footnotes

Bibliography

 Heatwole, H. (1999). Sea Snakes. New South Wales: University of New South Wales Press.
 Voris, Harold K. (1985). "Population size estimates for a marine snake (Enhydrina schistosa) in Malaysia." Copeia 1985 (4): 955–961
 
 

 
Snake genera
Taxa named by John Edward Gray